This is a list of magazines which contain avant-garde material and content. Notable avant-garde magazines include:

0–9

3:AM Magazine (2000–), Paris
291 (1915–1916), New York City
391 (1917–1924), Barcelona

A
aCOMMENT (1940–1947), Melbourne
Al Adab (1953–2012), Beirut
Akasztott Ember (1922–1923), 	Vienna
Algol (1947), Catalonia
 Apollon (1909–1917), St. Petersburg
Avant-Garde (1968–1971), New York City

B
 Bauhaus (1926–1931), Germany
Black Music (1973–1984), United Kingdom

C
Ça Ire (1920–1923), Antwerp

D
Dau al set (1948–1951), Catalonia
Denver Quarterly (1966–), Denver

F
Frigidaire (1980–2008), Rome

G
La Gaceta Literaria (1927–1932), Madrid
Galerie 68 (1968–1971), Cairo

H
Helhesten (1941–1944), Copenhagen

J
La Jeune Belgique (1880–1897), Brussels

K
Kino-Fot (1922–1923), Soviet Union
Klaxon (1922–1923), São Paulo, Brazil
Klingen (1917–1920), Copenhagen
Kritisk Revy (1926–1928), Copenhagen

L
Language (1978–1981), United States
London Bulletin (1938–1940), London

M
MA (1916–1925), Budapest–Vienna
Al Majalla Al Jadida (1929–1944), Cairo
 Martin Fiero (1924–1927), Buenos Aires
Merlin (1952–1954), Paris
Minotaure (1933–1939), Paris
Musicworks (1978–), Toronto

N

Noi: Rivista d’arte futurista (1917–1925), Rome
Nomad (1959–1962), Los Angeles
Nou Nou Hau (1998–2002), Japan

O
Octubre (1933–1934), Madrid
Het Overzicht (1921–1925), Antwerp

P
Poedjangga Baroe (1933–1942), Jakarta
Poesia (1905–), Milan
Portfolio: An Intercontinental Quarterly (1945–1947), Washington, DC
Prometeo (1908–1912), Madrid
Punct (1924–1925), Bucharest

Q

The Quarterly (1987–1995), New York City
Quosego (1928–1929), Helsinki

R
Ray (1926–1927), United Kingdom
Resimli Ay (1924–1938), Istanbul
Revista de Avance (1927–1930), Havana

S
S4N (1919–1925), Northampton, MA
Savant publications (1977–), Monterey, CA
Sburătorul (1919–1927), Bucharest
Servet-i Fünun (1891–1944), Istanbul
Shi'r (1957–1969), Beirut
Shirakaba (1910–1917), Tokyo
Signal, International Review of Signalist Research (1970–2004), Belgrade
 Simbolul (1912), Bucharest
Sobaka (1998–2006), Russia
De Stijl (1917–), Amsterdam
Der Sturm (1910–1932), Berlin

T
 Taarnet (1893–1894), Copenhagen
Al Tatawwur (1940), Cairo
Tel Quel (1960–1982), Paris
 A Tett (1915–1916), Hungary
Troços (1916–1917), Barcelona

U
Ultra (1922), Helsinki
Unu (1928–1932), Bucharest

V
Valori plastici (1918–1921), Rome
Il Verri (1956–), Milan

W
The Wire (1982–), London

avant